Flannigan is a common Irish surname, and may refer to:

People
 Allen J. Flannigan, American politician
 Iain Flannigan, Scottish professional footballer
 Katherine Flannigan, Scottish murderer
 Katherine Mary Flannigan, Irish American immigrant and novelist
 Maureen Flannigan, American actress
 Richard C. Flannigan, American jurist
 Tracy Flannigan, independent film maker

Fictional characters
 Blair Flannigan, a fictional character in the Yu-Gi-Oh! GX anime series
 Jezzie Flannigan, a fictional character in the James Patterson novel Along Came a Spider

Places
 Flannigan Township, Hamilton County, Illinois
 South Flannigan Township, Hamilton County, Illinois

See also
 Flanigan
 Flannagan (disambiguation)
 Flanagan (disambiguation)